Glenn Brown (1854–1932) was an American architect and historian.

He wrote a two-volume History of the United States Capitol (1901 and 1904) and more than 100 articles. In 1927, Brown was elected into the National Academy of Design as an associate member.

Several of his works are listed on the U.S. National Register of Historic Places.

Works include:
Joseph Beale House, 2301 Massachusetts Ave., NW., Washington, D.C. (Brown, Glenn), NRHP-listed
Dumbarton Bridge, Q St. over Rock Creek Park, NW., Washington, D.C. (Brown, Glenn & Bedford), NRHP-listed
Glenwood Cemetery Mortuary Chapel, 2219 Lincoln Rd., NE, Washington, D.C. (Brown, Glenn), NRHP-listed
National Union Building, 918 F St., NW, Washington, D.C. (Brown, Glenn), NRHP-listed
One or more works in Fourteenth Street Historic District, roughly bounded by S, 12th, N and 15th Sts., NW., Washington, D.C. (Brown,  Glenn, et al.), NRHP-listed

He also directed restoration works at Pohick Church beginning in 1901.

References

1854 births
1932 deaths
19th-century American architects
20th-century American architects
20th-century American historians
20th-century American male writers
National Academy of Design associates
American male non-fiction writers
Members of the American Academy of Arts and Letters